Brenda Catherine Lawson (born 30 October 1967) is a New Zealand rower. She was twice world champion in women's double sculls with Philippa Baker, and they were both inducted into the New Zealand Sports Hall of Fame in 2012.

Lawson was born in 1967 in Nelson; her mother is Val Wilson. She received her education at Nayland College and lived in Nelson until age 17, when she left to progress her rowing career.

Lawson rowed for clubs in Wairau, Hamilton, and Whanganui.

Along with Philippa Baker she finished 4th in the women's double sculls at the 1992 Summer Olympics. Lawson and Baker then went on to become double sculls world champions twice in a row, first in 1993 in Račice, Czech Republic, and then in 1994 in Indianapolis, USA. At the 1995 World Rowing Championships in Tampere, Finland, they came third. At the 1996 Summer Olympics, Lawson and Baker came sixth in the double sculls.

Lawson and Baker were named New Zealand team of the year at the 1994 Halberg Awards, and they also won the supreme award. In 2012, Baker and Lawson were inducted into the New Zealand Sports Hall of Fame, the first woman rowers to achieve this accolade. The Sports Hall of Fame citation reads:

Lawson and Baker competed again at the 2017 World Masters Games in Auckland, as part of the New Zealand women's eight.

References

External links
 

|-

|-

1967 births
Living people
New Zealand female rowers
Sportspeople from Nelson, New Zealand
Rowers at the 1992 Summer Olympics
Rowers at the 1996 Summer Olympics
Olympic rowers of New Zealand
World Rowing Championships medalists for New Zealand
People educated at Nayland College
20th-century New Zealand women